WAMC (1400 AM) is a public radio station licensed to Albany, New York and owned by WAMC, Inc. The station broadcasts with 1 kW, and is an AM repeater of WAMC-FM.

History
WAMC was first licensed on August 1, 1930 to W. Neal Parker and Herbert M. Metcalfe as WBGF in Glens Falls, New York, and initially broadcast on 1370 kHz.

In 1932 the station's license was assigned to O. T. Griffin and G. F. Bisssel, representatives for the Elmira Star-Gazette, and the call letters became WESG. The newspaper proposed to move the station to Elmira and change its frequency to 1420 kHz. However, this plan was abandoned a few months later, when the newspaper decided to instead lease Cornell University's station in Ithaca, WEAI. Therefore the WESG call letters were transferred to the Ithaca operation, with the Glens Falls station changing its call sign to WGLC, and remaining on 1370 kHz. The next year WGLC moved to Hudson Falls, New York.

In late 1934 the call letters were changed to WABY, when Al Kelert moved the station to Albany, in turn making the first station to broadcast from that city (though not the first one to originate, a distinction held by WOKO, now WOPG). WABY moved to 1400 kHz in 1941 due to the North American Regional Broadcasting Agreement (NARBA) frequency shift.

The station provided the typical mix of popular music and network programming throughout most of its first 30 years of service. In 1961, the station changed to a high energy top-40 format, but was short-lived as the competition in that format was intense, leaving the format in late 1963. From 1964 to 1971, WABY ran a MOR format, followed by oldies in 1971, and a return to top-40 in 1973. By 1976, it had changed to all-news, using NBC's "News and Information Service."  It then switched to country in 1979. In 1981, WABY changed to a Christian format until 1982 when it was flipped to adult standards. Getting many key market names, WABY spent years as one of the highest-rated standards stations in the United States, and added an FM simulcast on 94.5 MHz in 1995.

In February 1999, Bendat sold his stations to Tele-Media, Inc., which switched the AM side to an all-news format by day with simulcasting of the FM (which itself would flip to adult contemporary that summer) on nights and weekends. This arrangement remained through Tele-Media's ownership of the station through Tele-Media's sale of WABY and WKLI to Galaxy Communications in August 2001 and through the flip of 94.5 FM to classic rock as WRCZ.

On April 22, 2002, after 68 years, the WABY calls left 1400 kHz as Galaxy replaced it with WHTR and launched a hot talk simulcast with new move in 93.7 FM. (As a tribute, a Mechanicville, New York station (now WSSV) adopted the WABY call letters from 2002 to 2014; that station's owners then moved the call sign to a co-owned station in Watervliet).

The talk format was short-lived, and that August, 1400 and 93.7 switched to modern rock as WKRD (1400 retained the WHTR calls). Galaxy sold 1400 to Northeast Public Radio (WAMC, Inc.) in February 2003, giving it the WAMC calls (90.3 FM took on the WAMC-FM calls as a result). The WABY call sign was displayed on the WAMC tower until recently, although the current WABY broadcasts from a different location.

See also
 WAMC-FM

References

External links

 (covering WBGF / WESG / WGLC / WABY from 1930-1981)

AMC (AM)
Radio stations established in 1930
NPR member stations
1930 establishments in New York (state)